Harriet Mathew was an 18th-century London socialite and patron of the arts, who is considered an important early patron of John Flaxman and William Blake. She was the wife of the Reverend Anthony Stephen Mathew (also known by the pseudonym Henry Mathew).

Alexander Gilchrist, in his Life of Blake, writes of her:

John Thomas Smith was introduced to Blake by Mrs Mathew and heard him read and sing his poetry on several occasions; it was here that the qualities of his voice and reception of his audience were recorded in his contemporary biographical notes. Smith also notes she was "extremely zealous in promoting the celebrity of Blake" and as responsible, via her husband and his friends, for the printing of his Poetical Sketches (1783). Blake later satirised the  Mathews, and the Johnson Circle and dinners, in 'An Island in the Moon'.

A vaguely detailed story regarding the Mathews early patronage of Flaxman was first given by J. T. Smith, and repeated by Blake and Flaxman's biographers. A collection of sketches bearing titles of 'Harriet Mathew' and her relations have been attributed to Flaxman.

Issue
Henry William Mathew

References

Further reading

Patrons of literature
English patrons of music
Year of birth missing
Year of death missing